The Craft Memorial Library (CML) is a public library serving the city of Bluefield, West Virginia. CML also operates as part of the Mountain Library Network, a resource sharing consortium which unites public library services across West Virginia. The library is governed by a publicly elected board of trustees.

References

External links
Craft Memorial Library website

Public libraries in West Virginia
Education in Mercer County, West Virginia
Buildings and structures in Bluefield, West Virginia